Armamar is a municipality in Viseu District in Portugal. The population in 2011 was 6,297, in an area of 117.24 km2.

Geography
Administratively, the municipality is divided into 15 civil parishes (freguesias):
 Aldeias
 Aricera e Goujoim
 Armamar
 Cimbres
 Folgosa
 Fontelo
 Queimada
 Queimadela
 Santa Cruz 
 São Cosmado
 São Martinho das Chãs
 São Romão e Santiago
 Vacalar
 Vila Seca e Santo Adrião
 Coura

References

External links

Towns in Portugal
Populated places in Viseu District
Municipalities of Viseu District